Croston is a surname. Notable people with the surname include:

 Cole Croston (born 1993), American football player
 Dave Croston (born 1963), American football player
 Jim Croston (1912–?), English rugby player and coach